Galagete krameri is a moth in the family Autostichidae. It was described by Bernard Landry and Patrick Schmitz in 2008. It is found on the Galápagos Islands.

The wingspan is 7.8-9.5 mm. The forewings are brown with cream coloured lines. The hindwings are grey. Adults have been recorded on wing in February and March.

Etymology
The species is named for Dr. Peter Kramer, president of the Charles Darwin Foundation for the Galápagos.

References

Moths described in 2008
Galagete